Tight gas is natural gas produced from reservoir rocks with such low permeability that massive hydraulic fracturing is necessary to produce the well at economic rates. This natural gas is trapped within rocks with very low permeability, in other words, they are sealed in very impermeable and hard rocks, making their formation "tight". These impermeable reservoirs which produce dry natural gas are also called "Tight Sand". Tight gas reservoirs are generally defined as having less than 0.1 millidarcy (mD) matrix permeability and less than ten percent matrix porosity. Although shales have low permeability and low effective porosity, shale gas is usually considered separate from tight gas, which is contained most commonly in sandstone, but sometimes in limestone. Tight gas is considered an unconventional source of natural gas. But they are much older than the Conventional gas. Tight gas was formed 248 million years ago in Paleozoic formations. Cementation and recrystallization changed a conventional gas reserve which reduced the permeability of the rock and natural gas was trapped within these rock formations. Horizontal and directional drilling is used to extract tight gas deposits as they run along the formation which in turn allows more natural gas to enter the well that was dug. Numerous wells can be drilled to access the gas. Hydraulic fracturing is one of the main methods to access the gas which requires breaking apart the rocks in the formation by pumping fracking fluids in to the wells. This increases permeability and allows gas to flow easily, freeing it from the trap. After that deliquifaction is used to help in the extraction.

Rock with permeabilities as little as one nanodarcy, reservoir stimulation may be economically productive with optimized spacing and completion of staged fractures to maximize yield concerning cost.

Examples
Some examples of tight gas reservoirs are:

 Muddy Sandstone/J Sandstone – Wattenberg Gas Field, Denver Basin, Colorado, US
 Mesaverde Group – Piceance Basin, Colorado, US
 Rotliegend – Germany and Netherlands
 Utica – Appalachian Basin, US & Canada

See also
 Unconventional (oil & gas) reservoir
 Shale gas
 Tight oil

References

Unconventional gas